João Victor Souza dos Santos (born 8 September 1998), commonly known as Vitinho, is a Brazilian footballer who currently plays as a forward for Vejle Boldklub.

Career statistics

Club

References

1998 births
Living people
Brazilian footballers
Brazilian expatriate footballers
Association football forwards
Danish 1st Division players
Ykkönen players
Veikkausliiga players
Sport Club Internacional players
Vejle Boldklub players
Myllykosken Pallo −47 players
HIFK Fotboll players
Brazilian expatriate sportspeople in Denmark
Expatriate men's footballers in Denmark
Brazilian expatriate sportspeople in Finland
Expatriate footballers in Finland